Smoked scallops are scallops that have been smoked. A scallop is a common name applied to many species of marine bivalve mollusks in the family Pectinidae, the scallops. Scallops are a cosmopolitan family, found in all of the world's oceans.

Smoked scallops have been described as delicious in part due to how the mollusk absorbs the smoky flavor "better than just about any other seafood". They have also been described as having a firm and chewy texture and consistency. They are sometimes served as appetizers or as an ingredient in the preparation of various dishes and appetizers. They are also sometimes used to add flavor to a dish, such as grating smoked scallop over the top of a dish to finish it.

Dish examples

See also

 Conpoy – a type of dried seafood product made from the adductor muscle of scallops.
 List of edible molluscs
 List of smoked foods
 Scallop – as food
 Smoked oyster

References

Further reading
 Fish and Shellfish, Grilled and Smoked - Karen Adler, Judith M. Fertig. p. 256.
 Marc Forgione: Recipes and Stories from the Acclaimed Chef and Restaurant - Marc Forgione, Olga Massov. p .346-349.

External links

 Smoked scallop Niçoise. BBC Food.
 Smoked scallop and mussel chowder. Boston.com.

Smoked food